Burning Bridges is the thirteenth studio album by American rock band Bon Jovi consisting of new songs, as well as formerly unreleased and unfinished songs. Released on August 21, 2015 by Mercury Records. Produced by John Shanks, it was the first release since the departure of former guitarist Richie Sambora in 2013 (although he receives a co-writing credit on the single "Saturday Night Gave Me Sunday Morning"), with Shanks handling the lead guitar parts. Burning Bridges is their last album to be released through Mercury, marking the end of their 32-year relationship with the label. According to Jon Bon Jovi, the album serves as a "fan record" to tie in with an accompanying international tour: "It's songs that weren't finished, that were finished, a couple of new ones like the one we released as a single 'We Don't Run." Burning Bridges was followed by This House Is Not for Sale, the band's fourteenth studio album released in 2016 which featured all new songs.

Background
On November 18, 2014, in an interview with Pierre Robert from WMMR-FM Radio, lead singer Jon Bon Jovi confirmed that he started writing songs for the upcoming Bon Jovi album and that album is going to be recorded in 2015 and released in 2016. He also confirmed that lead guitarist Richie Sambora left the band and said that the doors are wide open for him if he wants to return to the band, even though it is highly unlikely. Jon said: "I’d be hard-pressed to [allow him to return], so would David, so would Tico. It’d be a lot for us [to allow him back]. After a year and a half and you miss 80 shows … I don’t think that’s possible.” By February 2015, Jon confirmed that he was still in an early stage of songwriting process with around 12 songs written and that inspiration for writing those songs came out of reading newspapers.

Burning Bridges was conceived to fulfill Bon Jovi's commitment to Mercury Records, as the band and label could not agree on adjusted terms for the band's recording contract. "I've stayed at that label my entire life32 years. I am the longest tenured artist on Mercury, or whatever they are called this week. But my deal was up, and that's that," said Jon Bon Jovi in an interview with Billboard. The album's title track makes explicit reference to Bon Jovi's dissatisfaction with the label. According to Bon Jovi, "This hits it right in the head and tells you what happened. Listen to the lyrics because it explains exactly what happened. And that's that." Regarding the split, a representative for Mercury Records stated, "Jon is a rock 'n' roll icon, and we are so proud of his 30-year collaboration with Mercury, which brought extraordinary commercial and creative success. We wish Jon only the best."

Additional information
Burning Bridges is the first album without guitarist Richie Sambora who left the band in 2013.
It is also the first album in 29 years to not feature a credit by Desmond Child, who has co-written or produced at least one song on every Bon Jovi album since 1986's Slippery When Wet.

Reception

Steven Thomas Erlewine from Allmusic gave the album 1.5 stars out of 5 by saying that "'fan album' not only sounds kinder, it also identifies precisely the audience that would be interested in this brief, power ballad-heavy collection". Chris Jordan from Asbury Park Press gave a positive review stating that "the new album from Bon Jovi, features a spark of anger from frontman Jon Bon Jovi". Jon M. Gilbertson from Milwaukee Journal Sentinel gave mixed review stating that "Artistically, it represents Bon Jovi's transformation from 1980s hair-metal act to 2015 adult-contemporary act. Sub-Springsteen working-class references, spiritually patriotic clichés and foursquare, bombastic riffs abound". Glenn Gamboa from Newsday rated the album with B− stating that "'Burning Bridges' does sound a bit, well, burned-out". Rob Garratt from The National gave the album 2 stars out of 5 by saying "new album offers little more than a fresh excuse to refill the coffers and add a few more set fillers to a multimillion-dollar touring juggernaut that is still dining out on 1980s anthems".

The album debuted at No. 13 on Billboard, and No. 3 on Rock Albums on its release, selling 19,000 copies in the first week.   The album has sold 67,000 copies in the United States as of August 2016.

Promotion
The album features twin lead singles, "We Don't Run" and "Saturday Night Gave Me Sunday Morning", both released on July 31, 2015. Saturday Night Gave Me Sunday Morning premiered on Hitradio Ö3 on July 17, 2015. at 9:45 a.m. Originally written in The Circle sessions, it was finished for this album. Three days later, on July 20, 2015, Brazilian radio station "Radio Rock" premiered "We Don't Run". Though not released as singles, the songs "Blind Love" and "A Teardrop to the Sea" were digitally released on August 7, 2015, followed by "I'm Your Man" on August 13, 2015. Lyrics videos for all the songs have been released on Bon Jovi's YouTube account.

Track listing

Personnel

Bon Jovi
 Jon Bon Jovi – lead vocals, acoustic guitar
 David Bryan – keyboards, piano, backing vocals
 Tico Torres – drums
Additional Personnel
 Hugh McDonald – bass
 John Shanks – guitars, backing vocals
 Lorenza Ponce – string arrangements and viola/violin/cello 
 Mike Rew – rhythm guitar, backing vocals 

Production
 John Shanks, Jon Bon Jovi – Producers
 Paul LaMalfa – Mixing and Recording
 Phil Nicolo – Mastering
 Nathan Odden - Recording Assistant
 Dan Tatarowicz – Mastering Assistant
 Avatar Studios, Henson Studios – Studio

Charts

Weekly charts

Year-end charts

Certifications

Release history

Footnotes

References

2015 compilation albums
Bon Jovi compilation albums
Mercury Records compilation albums
Albums produced by John Shanks